Mel-O-Toons (sometimes erroneously spelled Mello Toons) was a series of six-minute animated cartoons, using limited animation, and were produced starting in 1959 by New World Productions and syndicated by United Artists.

The stories featured various folk tales, Greco-Roman myths, Biblical stories, classic literary adaptations, and adaptations of classical music and ballet, as well as stories about animals written by Thornton Burgess. The soundtracks were often taken from existing children's records, licensed from the original labels,  including RCA Records and Capitol Records. 104 cartoons were produced.

In October 1960, United Artists bought time on a station in Toledo, Ohio, to test the Mel-O-Toons for audience response; they showed two of the films, "Rumplestiltskin" and "Waltz of the Flowers". Variety reported that the viewer response was entirely positive, saying, "Many parents compared the Mel-O-Toons favorable to what they called the usual violence in kiddie programming." A week later, UA bought a full-page ad in Variety, announcing: "We passed the test in Toledo!" The ad described the test: "Here's what happened: Two of these new cartoons were shown in a fifteen-minute on-the-air audition over WSPD-TV. Viewers were asked to send in their opinions, with no prizes or incentives of any kind. In less than a week, over 400 replies arrived. All except five individuals were wildly enthusiastic."

After many years out of circulation, public domain prints have turned up on videotape and DVD.

Partial episode list

The Adventures of Paddy the Beaver
Aladdin
Ali Baba
Buffalo Bill
Casper The Curious Kitten
Christopher Columbus
Cinderella
Daniel Boone
David and Goliath
Diana and the Golden Apples
Dinky Pinky
El Torito
The Enchanted Horse
Endymion and Selene
Flying Carpet
Fun on a Rainy Day
Gosomer Wump
Hansel and Gretel
Haydn's Toy Symphony
Hiawatha
Hunters of the Sea
I Wish I Had
Knights of Old
Little Hawk
Little Johnny Everything
Little Sambo
Miguel the Mighty Matador
Noah and the Ark
Omicron and Sputnik
Panchito
Paul Bunyan
Peer Gynt's Adventures in Arabia
Peer Gynt in the Hall of the Mountain King
Peer Gynt in the Stormy Sea
Peppy Possum
Peter and the Wolf
Peter Cottontail
Pinocchio
Robin Hood
Rumplestiltskin
Sinbad
Sir Lancelot
Sleeping Beauty
Snow White
Sparky's Magic Echo
The Eagle and the Thrush
The Emperor's Nightingale
The King's Trumpet
The Magic Clock
The Red Shoes
The Seasons
The Trojan Horse
Tom Sawyer
Treasure Island
Waltz of the Flowers
War and Peace

In popular culture
Footage from the Christopher Columbus episode was used in Last Week Tonight's "How Is This Still a Thing" segment on Columbus Day, which aired on October 12, 2014.

References

1960s American animated television series
1960s American anthology television series
1960 American television series debuts
1960 American television series endings
American children's animated anthology television series